Laiya Beach is a beach destination in San Juan, Batangas, Philippines. It is one of the most visited beaches in the country.

The beach's sand is composed of weathering-formed crushed shells.

Banana boat and jet ski services are offered to people staying in resorts. Fishing boats are also frequently seen near the shores; most of the catch of the fishermen are sold directly to resorts. Vendors roam the beaches, selling souvenir items such as bracelets and butterfly knives (Batangas Tagalog: balisong).

References

Tourist attractions in Batangas
Landforms of Batangas
Beaches of the Philippines